Grünstadt-Land is a former Verbandsgemeinde ("collective municipality") in the district of Bad Dürkheim, in Rhineland-Palatinate, Germany. It was situated on the north-eastern edge of the Palatinate forest, around the town Grünstadt, which was the seat of Grünstadt-Land, but not part of the Verbandsgemeinde. In January 2018 it was merged into the new Verbandsgemeinde Leiningerland.

Grünstadt-Land consisted of the following Ortsgemeinden ("local municipalities"):

Former Verbandsgemeinden in Rhineland-Palatinate